Tinambac, officially the Municipality of Tinambac, is a 1st class municipality in the province of Camarines Sur, Philippines. According to the 2020 census, it has a population of 70,176 people.

History

The town of Tinambac was considered to be a trading center of villages surrounding the eastern side of Mt. Isarog . It was in this place where tobacco, then a prohibited product, was exchanged by the townspeople of Tinambac.

Its establishment as a separate municipality occurred during the latter part of the 18th century and this was known as the mission post of Himoragat. In 1829 when the Spanish administration divided the province of Camarines Sur into four districts, Tinambac fall under the District of Isarog.

A church was built atop a hill which still stands at present where the residents of this simple town give way to the celebration of its fiesta every 17th day of May. St. Pascual Baylon is the patron saint of this town.

Geography

Barangays
Tinambac is politically subdivided into 45 barangays.

Climate

Demographics

Bikol is the predominant language.

Economy

Total agricultural area is estimated to be , 96% of which are planted with coconut. Only around 4% are devoted to rice, corn, banana and root crops.

Commercial establishments
Producers Bank
Palawan Express (remittance center)
LCC Supermarket
LCC Department Store
RJVM Moonvic Groceries
Teves Store
NTE Harvest Plus
Mang Inasal
Viewport Central Commercial (Tambang)
Angena Trading
RRB Drug
Rocio's Mini Mart
Tinambac Market

Infrastructure
Communication facilities
 1 Post Office located in the Poblacion, staffed by a Post Master and mail carriers
 Telegraph service offered by local branch of National Telecommunications Office
 Branches of RCPI and LBC Air Cargo
 Land line communication facilities

Health services
 Tinambac Municipal Hospital
 Medicare Community Hospital - Sogod, Tinambac
 RRB Maternity, Family Planning, and Lying-in Clinic

Gallery

References

External links

 [ Philippine Standard Geographic Code]
Philippine Census Information
Official site of the province of Camarines Sur/Tinambac

Municipalities of Camarines Sur